The Pasadena Star-News is a paid local daily newspaper for the greater Pasadena, California area. The Pasadena Star-News is a member of Southern California News Group (formerly the Los Angeles Newspaper Group), since 1996. It is also part of the San Gabriel Valley Newspaper Group, along with the San Gabriel Valley Tribune and the Whittier Daily News.

History 

First published in 1884, the paper was originally located at the corner of Colorado Boulevard and Oakland Avenue for years. That building is now home to Technique at Le Cordon Bleu College of Culinary Arts and 24 Hour Fitness. The first radio broadcast of the Rose Parade in 1926 aired from the newspaper's radio station KPSN, which broadcast out of a pair of radio towers that the building once hosted. From 1904 to 1956 Charles H. Prisk, was one of the first publishers and owner of the Pasadena Star-News. Charles was also the owner of the Pasadena Post and the Long Beach Press-Telegram. William F. Prisk, his brother, was a publisher. William Paddock, Prisk's son-in-law, was the vice president and general manager of the Star-News, Pasadena-Post and the Press-Telegram. Willam Paddock married Prisk's daughter Neva Prisk Malaby, then began working at the newspapers as a result. William Paddock, also known as Olympic Champion Charles "Charley" Paddock, ran the world record for the 100-yard dash in 1921 at 9.5 seconds, giving him the title "World's Fastest Human". Editors in the historical Star-News Building included Ed Essertier, Charles Cherniss, Bill Winter, Larry Wilson, and Frank Girardot. Publishers after Bernard J. Ridder included Bill Applebee.

Ridder Newspapers bought the Star-News in 1956 and Bernard J. Ridder took over as publisher. Ridder merged with Knight to form Knight Ridder  in 1974. The paper was sold off in 1989 to a company owned by William Dean Singleton; the Thomson Corporation bought majority control of the paper a year later.  Thomson sold the Star-News to Singleton's MediaNews Group in 1996, which went on to become part of the Los Angeles Newspaper Group.

The newspaper also publishes the Rose Magazine which provides coverage of the Tournament of Roses Parade and the Rose Bowl Game since 1994.

Coverage area for the Pasadena Star-News includes the cities of Pasadena, South Pasadena, San Marino, Sierra Madre, Alhambra, San Gabriel, Temple City and Arcadia and the unincorporated communities of Altadena and East Pasadena.

Community news, events and opinion
Patt Diroll writes a weekly social events column with photos and a calendar listing on Mondays and editorial board member Larry Wilson writes a column on Pasadena history and current events on Wednesdays.

Previous owners 

 Charles H. Prisk
 William F. Prisk

Awards 
The California Newspapers Publishers Association awarded the Pasadena Star-News four of the top journalism awards out of thirty-eight awards given to its parent company Los Angeles News Group at the annual awards luncheon in San Diego.
The California Newspaper Publisher Association, the state's press association, named the Pasadena Star-News, California's best mid-sized daily in 2015.
Winner of the California Newspaper Association's award given for best website.

References

External links

Daily newspapers published in Greater Los Angeles
Mass media in Pasadena, California
MediaNews Group publications
Newspapers established in 1905
1905 establishments in California